The Wheatland Masonic Temple in Wheatland, California is a historic building constructed in 1898. The ground floor has been used as commercial space since its construction.  Until 1948 the upper floor meeting rooms were used jointly by the Independent Order of Odd Fellows and the Freemasons.  In 1948 the Masons bought out the Odd Fellows.

It was listed on the National Register of Historic Places in 1993.

It was designed by Sacramento architect A. A. Cook who also designed:
the Odd Fellows Building (1882–83) in Red Bluff, California,
the NRHP-listed Cone and Kimball Building at 747 Main St. in Red Bluff, and
the NRHP-listed Pleasants Ranch at 8212 Pleasants Valley Rd. in Vacaville, California.

References

Clubhouses on the National Register of Historic Places in California
Neoclassical architecture in California
Masonic buildings completed in 1898
Buildings and structures in Yuba County, California
Masonic buildings in California
National Register of Historic Places in Yuba County, California